The 2008 Singapore League Cup marks the second occasion on which the Singapore League Cup competition has been staged. (The event was launched in 2007). Its official sponsored name for 2008 is the Avaya-J&J League Cup.

In 2007, the event was held before the start of the S.League season (and serving as a pre-season warm-up tournament), and was won by Woodlands Wellington FC.  However, in 2008, the event is being held during the S.League season.  All 12 S.League teams have entered the 2008 competition.

The cup is being played over four rounds.  The top four teams in the S.League in 2007 were given a bye to the quarter-final stage.

The final will be played on 16 June at Jalan Besar Stadium.

Teams

  Albirex Niigata FC (S)
 Balestier Khalsa FC
  Dalian Shide Siwu FC
 Geylang United FC
 Gombak United FC
 Home United FC
 Sengkang Punggol FC
 Singapore Armed Forces FC (SAFFC)
  Super Reds FC
 Tampines Rovers FC
 Woodlands Wellington FC
  Young Lions

Round one
The draw for the first knockout round was held on Tuesday, 13 May 2008 in Singapore.  The first round matches kick off on 30 May.  The matches are played on a one match basis. The winners advance to the quarter-final stage.  Teams who had finished in top 4 positions of 2007 S.League received a bye and need not participate in Round one knockout competition. They were: Singapore Armed Force FC, Home United, Tampines Rovers and Gombak United respectively.

Knockout Bracket - Starting from Quarter-Finals

Quarter-finals
1st Legs

2nd Legs

Gombak United progressed 2-1 on aggregate score

Balestier Khalsa progressed 5-1 on aggregate score

Young Lions progressed on away goals rule after 3-3 draw on aggregate score

Super Reds progressed 6-1 on aggregate score

Semi-finals

1st Legs

2nd Legs

Gombak United progressed 5-2 on aggregate score

Super Reds FC progressed 1-0 on aggregate score

3rd-place Playoff

Final

Top scorers
Last updated 16 June 2008

See also

 S.League
 Singapore Cup
 Singapore League Cup
 Singapore Charity Shield
 Football Association of Singapore
 List of football clubs in Singapore

External links
 Official S.League website
 Football Association of Singapore website

2008
League Cup
2008 domestic association football cups
May 2008 sports events in Asia
June 2008 sports events in Asia